The Potters National Bank (also known as the Potters Bank and Trust Company) was a regional bank located in East Liverpool, Ohio, United States. It opened in 1881, and operated until its acquisition by National City Corp. in 1993, as a member bank of Ohio Bancorp.

History
The bank was organized in July 1881 in East Liverpool, Ohio. The first location was in a room on Second Street.  The bank was successful and the directors soon purchased property at Broadway and Fourth streets where they built a two-story brick and stone building. The building was occupied by the bank as late as March 1901.

By 1901, the bank moved to a new location on East Fifth Street. The original building was taken over by the East Liverpool Potteries Company while the bank built and occupied their new offices.

In 1924 the bank built occupied a new, larger building where the former 1901 structure was located. The bank directors purchased two additional lots to accommodate the new building. The newer building contained huge basement rooms, committee rooms, and a community room for the public. Construction of this building was begun and completed in 1925. The bank occupied this building on November 1925. Its total cost was $300,000.

Fate
In 1993, National City Corp. purchased Ohio Bancorp of Youngstown, Ohio. The acquisition included five other local banks. The Potters National Bank operated within Home Savings and Loan Company of Youngstown until 2002. The 1924 building has since been used by multiple banking corporations.  In 2020, it was restored and converted into a taproom and restaurant called Renovatio's.

The 1881 building was added to the National Register of Historic Places in November 1985. It was demolished in November 2010 due to neglect.

References

Commercial buildings on the National Register of Historic Places in Ohio
Victorian architecture in Ohio
Commercial buildings completed in 1882
Buildings and structures in Columbiana County, Ohio
National Register of Historic Places in Columbiana County, Ohio
East Liverpool, Ohio
Buildings and structures demolished in 2010